Yin Lichuan (born 1973) is a Chinese writer, poet and filmmaker. A graduate of Peking University and ESEC (école supérieure d'études cinématographiques in Paris), Yin made her name writing novels and poetry, including A Little More Comfort and Fucker. She is known as a member of the "Lower Body Poets." Her book of selected poems Karma in bilingual edition (Tolsun Books, 2020) is translated by poet Fiona Sze-Lorrain.

Recently, Yin has expanded into film. Her debut, The Park (2007), was produced as part of the Yunnan New Film Project. Her sophomore effort, Knitting, was released in 2008.

Filmography

References

External links 

Yin Lichuan at the Chinese Movie Database

Film directors from Chongqing
People's Republic of China poets
Chinese women film directors
1973 births
Post 70s Generation
Living people
Screenwriters from Chongqing
Poets from Chongqing